Kirkland Leroy Irvis (December 27, 1919 – March 16, 2006) was a teacher, activist and politician based in Pennsylvania; he was the first African American to serve as a speaker of the house in any state legislature in the United States since Reconstruction. (John Roy Lynch (1847–1939) of Mississippi had been the first African American to hold that position.) Irvis, a Democrat, represented Pittsburgh in the Pennsylvania House of Representatives from 1958–1988.

Early life
Kirkland Leroy Irvis was born in 1919 in Saugerties, New York, son of Francis H. and Harriet Irvis.  He attended local schools. He went to college, graduating summa cum laude in 1938 from the University of New York State Teachers College (now State University of New York at Albany) with a master's degree in education, the second black American to graduate from that college. During his degree, Irvis took classes with the folklorist Harold W Thompson, who praised Irvis for his collection of African American folklore. Irvis moved to Baltimore, Maryland, where he taught English and history in high schools until World War II. He was hired as a civilian flying instructor in the War Department.

Pennsylvania career
After World War II, Irvis moved to Pittsburgh, Pennsylvania. There he worked as the public relations secretary for the local chapter of the Urban League. While with the Urban League, he led a demonstration in 1947 against Jim Crow employment discrimination by Pittsburgh's department stores. This was  the first demonstration of its kind in American history.

Irvis became an entrepreneur for a time, managing a toy factory and a hot dog stand. In 1950, he left his businesses and pursued blue-collar work in steel mills and road construction, to earn money in order to go to law school.

In 1954 he earned a law degree from University of Pittsburgh School of Law. He worked as law clerk to Judge Anne X. Alpern, was hired as Pittsburgh city solicitor, and advanced to become the first black assistant district attorney of Allegheny County, Pennsylvania. He supplemented his income as a radio announcer for WILY. When his reputation had grown, he opened a private law practice downtown.

Irvis entered politics and was elected as the state representative from Pittsburgh's Hill District, serving in the legislature for 15 straight terms. Rep. Irvis sponsored more than 1600 bills, and is most known for bills promoting civil rights, fair housing, education, public health, highway safety, and modernization of the penal code. In 1972, after being denied accommodation by the Harrisburg, Pennsylvania-based Moose Lodge as the guest of a white member, Irvis was party to a case in the U.S. Supreme Court, Moose Lodge No. 107 v. Irvis, in which the Court upheld the right of the Moose Lodge to discriminate as a private club on the basis of race; the racial discrimination policy was ended by Moose International Inc. within a year of the Supreme Court ruling. In 1977 he was voted unanimously by the representatives for the role of speaker of the house.

His most noted achievements include the passage of legislation creating the Pennsylvania Human Relations Commission, the Pennsylvania Higher Education Assistance Agency and Equal Opportunity Program, the state's community college system, the Minority Business Development Authority, and the Pennsylvania Council on the Arts. He is also largely responsible for the Pennsylvania House Ethics Committee, lobbyist registration, and the Legislative Audit Advisory Commission.

Later life
In 1988, the same year that he retired from politics, Irvis published collected poems under the title This Land of Fire, issued by Temple University. He also worked in making wood sculptures and displayed them. His wood sculptures have been displayed in exhibits throughout the country.

He died at age 86 of cancer.

Honors

Among the organizations to have formally honored Irvis are the NAACP, University of Pennsylvania, Lincoln University of Pennsylvania, and Dominion Resources The University of Pittsburgh has a K. Leroy Irvis Reading Room in Hillman Library.

In 2003, the South Office Building within the Pennsylvania Capitol Complex was renamed the Speaker K. Leroy Irvis Office Building. On March 25, 2013, the Community College of Allegheny County hosted a ceremony for the newly completed K. Leroy Irvis Science Center, named in honor of his work in helping to establish the community college system in Pennsylvania and for his long career of service on behalf of Allegheny County.

In 2017, the University of Pittsburgh renamed Pennsylvania Hall, a student residence hall on its upper campus, to the K. Leroy Irvis Hall in his honor.

Pennsylvania Democratic Party Chairman T. J. Rooney described Rep. Irvis as, "one of greatest legislative giants that the Commonwealth of Pennsylvania has ever seen ... [and] one of the most admired and respected Pennsylvanians we'll ever know."

Personal life 
Irvis married Katharyne Jones, and they had a son Reginald and daughter Sherri together. Katharyne died in 1958. In 1973 Irvis married Cathryn L. Edwards, who survived him, as do his grown children.

Irvis was Catholic.

The K. Leroy Irvis papers
The University of Pittsburgh Library System, Archives Service Center maintains a large collection of wide variety of material related to Irvis's life, career, and political activities. The collection consists of correspondence, legislative material, interviews, photographs, publications, and campaign literature. Highlights of the collection include:

 Biographical data
 Camp Hill Prison Riots - 1989-1990
 His hobbies - model airplanes, brass and woodwind bands, craftsman guilds, minority arts, and wood sculpting.
 Pennsylvania History
 Awards, degrees and honors

References

External links

K. Leroy Irvis' oral history video excerpts, The National Visionary Leadership Project
 Finding aid to the K. Leroy Irvis Papers, Archives Service Center, University of Pittsburgh

Sources
"Former Pa. House speaker K. Leroy Irvis dies", Pittsburgh Post-Gazette, March 16, 2006
"2003 Honorees – K. Leroy Irvis", Dominion Resources
"K. Leroy Irvis", PA House of Representatives Democratic Caucus

1919 births
2006 deaths
African-American state legislators in Pennsylvania
Activists for African-American civil rights
Politicians from Pittsburgh
Members of the Pennsylvania House of Representatives
Speakers of the Pennsylvania House of Representatives
University of Pittsburgh School of Law alumni
Deaths from cancer in Pennsylvania
20th-century American politicians
People from Ulster County, New York
University at Albany, SUNY alumni
Educators from Maryland
Activists from New York (state)
Educators from New York (state)
Educators from Pennsylvania
African-American Catholics
20th-century African-American politicians
21st-century African-American people
Roman Catholic activists